Petrol additives increase petrol's octane rating or act as corrosion inhibitors or lubricants, thus allowing the use of higher compression ratios for greater efficiency and power. Types of additives include metal deactivators, corrosion inhibitors, oxygenates and antioxidants.

Some additives are harmful and are regulated or banned in some countries.

Additives
Oxygenates
 Alcohols:
 Methanol (MeOH)
 Ethanol (EtOH); see also common ethanol fuel mixtures
 Isopropyl alcohol (IPA)
 n-butanol (BuOH)
 Gasoline grade t-butanol (GTBA)
 Ethers:
 Methyl tert-butyl ether (MTBE), now outlawed in many states of the U.S. for road use because of water contamination.
 Tertiary amyl methyl ether (TAME)
 Tertiary hexyl methyl ether (THEME)
 Ethyl tertiary butyl ether (ETBE)
 Tertiary amyl ethyl ether (TAEE)
 Diisopropyl ether (DIPE)

 Antioxidants, stabilizers
 Butylated hydroxytoluene (BHT)
 2,4-Dimethyl-6-tert-butylphenol
 2,6-Di-tert-butylphenol (2,6-DTBP)
 p-Phenylenediamine
 N,N'-Di-2-butyl-1,4-phenylenediamine
 Ethylenediamine

 Detergents; see also Top Tier Detergent Gasoline
 Amines aka "nitrogen enriched"
 Polybuteneamine (PBA)
 Polyetheramine (PEA); see also Techron
 Polyisobutyleneamine (PIBA)

 Antiknock agents
 Tetraethyllead (TEL), now banned almost everywhere for causing brain damage.
 Methylcyclopentadienyl manganese tricarbonyl (MMT) is a neurotoxic substance and is fatal if swallowed/inhaled and causes manganism.
 Ferrocene
 Dimethyl methylphosphonate
 Toluene
 Isooctane
 Triptane

 Lead scavengers (for leaded gasoline)
 Tricresyl phosphate (TCP) (also an AW additive and EP additive)
 1,2-Dibromoethane
 1,2-Dichloroethane

 Fuel dyes, most common:
 Solvent Red 24
 Solvent Red 26
 Solvent Yellow 124
 Solvent Blue 35

 Fuel additives in general
 Ether and other flammable hydrocarbons have been used extensively as starting fluid for many difficult-to-start engines, especially diesel engines
 Nitromethane, or "nitro", is a high-performance racing fuel
 Acetone is a vaporization additive, mainly used with methanol racing fuel
 Butyl rubber (as polyisobutylene succinimide, detergent to prevent fouling of diesel fuel injectors)
 Ferrous picrate is used in Diesel fuel to increase fuel conversion efficiency and reduce emissions.

Racing formulations
 Nitromethane can increase the cetane number of diesel fuel, improving its combustion properties
 Nitrous oxide, or simply nitrous, is an oxidizer used in many forms of motorsports such as drag racing and street racing.

Legislation

United States
Fuel additives in the United States are regulated under  section 211 of the Clean Air Act (as amended in January 1995). The Environmental Protection Agency (EPA) requires the registration of all fuel additives which are commercially distributed for use in highway motor vehicles in the United States, and may require testing and ban harmful additives. The EPA also regularly reviews the health and net economic benefits of Clean Air Act policies.

The act also requires deposit control additives (DCAs) be added to all petrol. This type of additive is a detergent additive that acts as a cleansing agent in small passages in the carburetor or fuel injectors. This in turn serves to ensure a consistent air and fuel mixture that will contribute to better gas mileage.

See also
metering pumps
Oil additive
Greenwashing

References
 ARRC Auto Repair Reference Center. Point 5 Technologies. Accessed via EbscoHost on November 27, 2009
 EPA: List of Registered Gasoline Additives (Under 40 CFR Part 79)

Petroleum products
 
Chemistry-related lists